This is a list of castles and chateaux located in the Olomouc Region of the Czech Republic.

B
 Bílá Lhota Chateau
 Bludov Castle
 Bludov Chateau
 Boreš Chateau
 Bouzov Castle
 Branná Chateau
 Brníčko Castle
 Brodek u Prostějova Chateau

C
 Chudobín Chateau
 Citov Chateau
 Čechy pod Kosířem Chateau
 Čekyně Chateau
 Černá Voda Chateau
 Čertův Hrádek Castle

D
 Dlouhá Loučka Chateau
 Dobromilice Chateau
 Dolany Chateau
 Doloplazy Chateau
 Drahotuše Castle
 Dřevohostice Chateau

E
 Edelštejn Castle

F
 Frankštát Castle

H
 Haňovice Chateau
 Helfštýn Castle
 Hluboký Castle
 Hluchov Chateau
 Horní Moštěnice Chateau
 Hoštejn Castle
 Hranice Chateau
 Hrubčice Chateau
 Hustopeče nad Bečvou Chateau

J
 Jánský vrch Chateau
 Jesenec Chateau
 Jeseník Chateau

K
 Kaltenštejn Castle
 Koberštejn Castle
 Konice Chateau
 Kožušany Chateau
 Krakovec Chateau
 Kralice na Hané Chateau
 Kunzov Chateau

L
 Laškov Chateau
 Leuchtenštejn Castle
 Lhotsko Chateau
 Lipník nad Bečvou Chateau
 Líšnice Castle
 Loučná nad Desnou Chateau

M
 Malhotice Chateau
 Mírov Castle
 Mořice Chateau

N
 Náměšť na Hané Castle
 Náměšť na Hané Chateau
 Nenakonice Chateau
 Nezamyslice Chateau
 Nové Zámky Chateau
 Nový Hrad (u Hanušovic) Castle

O
 Olomouc Castle
 Otaslavice Castle

P
 Pavlovice u Přerova Chateau
 Plumlov Chateau
 Polkovice Chateau
 Potštát Chateau
 Prostějov Chateau
 Přemyslovice Chateau
 Přerov Chateau
 Přestavlky Chateau
 Ptení Chateau
 Puchart Castle
 Pustý Zámek Castle

R
 Rabštejn (u Rýmařova) Castle
 Rokytnice Chateau
 Ruda nad Moravou Chateau
 Rybáře Castle
 Rychleby Castle
 Říkovice Chateau

S
 Skalička Chateau
 Sobotín Chateau
 Sovinec Castle
 Stražisko Castle
 Svrčov Castle
 Špránek Castle
 Šternberk Castle
 Šumperk Chateau

T
 Tepenec Castle
 Tovačov Chateau
 Tršice Chateau

U
 Úsov Chateau

V
 Velká Bystřice Chateau
 Velké Losiny Chateau
 Velký Týnec Chateau
 Veselíčko Chateau
 Vlčice Chateau
 Vřesovice Chateau
 Vsisko Chateau
 Všechovice Chateau
 Výšovice Chateau

Z
 Žádlovice Chateau
 Žerotín Chateau
 Žulová Castle
 Zábřeh Chateau

See also
 List of castles in the Czech Republic
 List of castles in Europe
 List of castles

External links 
 Castles, Chateaux, and Ruins 
 Czech Republic - Manors, Castles, Historical Towns
 Hrady.cz 

Castles in the Olomouc Region
Olomouc